António Rosa Mendes (1954–2013) was born in Vila Nova de Cacela, Portugal. He was a professor of history at the Algarve University (Portuguese: Universidade do Algarve).

In the year of 2005 he was the president of the Portuguese Cultural Capital in Faro.

References

1954 births
2013 deaths
People from Vila Real de Santo António
Academic staff of the University of Algarve